The 800s decade ran from January 1, 800, to December 31, 809.

Significant people
 Al-Amin
 Charlemagne
 Haroun al-Raschid
 Jayavarman II
 Nicephorus I
 Krum
 Du Mu

References

Sources